The Back To Business World Tour previously titled Moosetape Tour was an upcoming concert tour by Punjabi singer-songwriter Sidhu Moose Wala, in support of his third studio album MooseTape (2021). The tour was cancelled shortly after Moose Wala's death. It was to include other supporting artists such as Sunny Malton.

Death of Sidhu Moose Wala 
Moose Wala was shot dead in Punjab, India by unidentified assailants on 29 May 2022.

Background 
Tour was scheduled to be in 2021, but due to concerns from the ongoing COVID-19 pandemic , World Tour Postpones.

Tour's first leg announced by BollyBoom Entertainment India, that took place in 4 different cities of India which was produced by themselves only.

On December 26, 2021; the tour's promoter Platinum Events Inc introduced on their social media about the upcoming world tour of Sidhu Moose Wala & tease the fans by sharing pics with Sidhu itself.

Set list 

This set list is representative of the show on March 26, 2022, in Dubai, UAE. It is not representative of all concerts for the duration of the tour
 "295"
 "These Days" 
 "Satisfy"
 "Old-Skool"
 "GOAT"
 "Same-Beef"
 "US"
 "So-High"
 "Celebrity-Killer"
 "G-Shit"
Encore
 "Moosedrilla"

Notes
During the show in Mumbai on November 21, 2021, Raja Kumari joined Moose Wala onstage to perform their duet song "US".

Tour dates

References 

2022 concert tours
Concert tours of Canada
Concert tours of Europe
Concert tours of North America
Concert tours of the United Kingdom
Concert tours of the United States
Concert tours of Australia
Concert tours of New Zealand
Concert tours of Asia